Tibetans have been in Switzerland since the 1960s, when the Swiss Red Cross helped resettle 300 Tibetans in Switzerland. In addition, approximately 150 Tibetan orphans were adopted by Swiss families.

A number of Tibetans settled in the mountains of the Swiss Alps, because of its homelike terrain. The Tibetan children had some difficulty in school, due to the massive language barrier between German and Tibetan. But soon enough, the Tibetans were able to gain enough fluency in German, and were able to sit in the same class as regular Swiss children. Many of these Tibetan children would assimilate into the Swiss society, and would become "culturally confused". Some Swiss people even learned to speak in some Tibetan.

In 1968, in the village of Rikon im Tösstal, the Tibet Institute Rikon was established. It is the only Tibetan monastery in Switzerland.

With over 4,000 residing in the country in 2011, Tibetans make up the second largest Asian immigrant group in Switzerland, right behind Filipinos.

In the Tibetan diaspora, the Swiss community is the largest in Europe and one of the largest outside of the Himalayas and United States.

In 2018, the community numbered 8,000 individuals.

See also
 Eisenvogel
 Tibetan American
 Tibet
 Tibetan people

References

Swiss people of Tibetan descent
Ethnic groups in Switzerland